Guillermina López Balbuena (born 25 June 1973) is a Mexican politician from the Institutional Revolutionary Party. From 2007 to 2009 she served as Deputy of the LX Legislature of the Mexican Congress representing Puebla.

References

1973 births
Living people
Politicians from Puebla
Women members of the Chamber of Deputies (Mexico)
Institutional Revolutionary Party politicians
21st-century Mexican politicians
21st-century Mexican women politicians
Deputies of the LX Legislature of Mexico
Members of the Chamber of Deputies (Mexico) for Puebla